Lake Doberdò is the name of a sinkhole in the Province of Gorizia, Friuli-Venezia Giulia, Italy. It is located on the westernmost edge of the Karst plateau, close to the border with Slovenia. It is named after the village of Doberdò del Lago.

Overview
It has an area of approximately 0.36 km², depending on the time of year, and it is located around 2 km southwest of the village of Doberdò, not far from the Adriatic coast. The water is filtered through various ponors, and it is connected with the springs feeding the Timavo River, which are located a few kilometers southeast. The depth varies from 5 to 10 m. The lake is usually largest in autumn, when it is 1.2 km long and 350 m wide. During the frequent drought periods, the lake almost completely disappears, becoming a marsh-like area.

Lakes of Friuli-Venezia Giulia
Sinkholes of Europe
Landforms of Italy